West Columbia is an unincorporated community in Mason County, West Virginia, United States. West Columbia has a post office with ZIP code 25287.

The community most likely was named after Columbia, the female personification of the United States of America.

Infrastructure
The West Virginia Division of Corrections and Rehabilitation operates the women's prison Lakin Correctional Center in Lakin, near West Columbia.

Notable person
Georgiana Goddard King (1871–1939), Hispanist and medievalist

References

Unincorporated communities in Mason County, West Virginia
Unincorporated communities in West Virginia
West Virginia populated places on the Ohio River